Marble City (often simply called Marble) is a town in Sequoyah County, Oklahoma, United States. It is part of the Fort Smith, Arkansas-Oklahoma Metropolitan Statistical Area. The population was 263 at the 2010 census, an increase of 8.7 percent over the figure of 242 recorded in 2000, making it the seventh-largest town by population in Sequoyah County, after Gans and before Moffett.

History
The area around what is now Marble City was considered part of Lovely County, Arkansas Territory until 1829. In that year, the Federal Government began moving the Western Cherokees from other parts of Arkansas Territory into this area, then called Nicksville. Non-Indian settlers were ordered to vacate, and the Arkansas Territorial Legislature ended its claim to the land. Dwight Mission took over Nicksville. The area became part of Indian Territory.

A post office named Kidron was established in this area in 1835, to serve the Cherokee settlers in this area. The office moved to another location in 1858, where it was named Marble Salt Works. Another Kidron post office opened near Dwight Mission in 1859, but was discontinued in 1869. In 1869, the Post Office opened a new location named Kedron. By 1895, when commercial-scale quarrying of marble began in this area, the Kansas City, Pittsburg and Gulf Railroad (later known as the Kansas City Southern Railway) laid tracks through the area, the Kedron post office moved closer to the railroad and a marble quarry, and was renamed as Marble. The name was chosen because of its proximity to Oklahoma's only true marble outcrops. Commercial quarrying began there in 1895. The Ozark Marble Company operated the quarry from 1906 to 1914, producing material for building construction. 

Watie Davault served as mayor of Marble City for 47 years, when he retired in 1961.

Geography
Marble City is located at  (35.583191, -94.817383).

Demographics

As of the census of 2000, there were 242 people, 73 households, and 58 families residing in the town. The racial makeup of the town was 30.99% White, 66.53% Native American, and 2.48% from two or more races. Hispanic or Latino of any race were 3.31% of the population.

There were 73 households, out of which 32.9% had children under the age of 18 living with them, 42.5% were married couples living together, 34.2% had a female householder with no husband present, and 20.5% were non-families. 19.2% of all households were made up of individuals, and 9.6% had someone living alone who was 65 years of age or older. The average household size was 3.32 and the average family size was 3.78.

In the town, the population was spread out, with 35.1% under the age of 18, 8.3% from 18 to 24, 26.0% from 25 to 44, 18.2% from 45 to 64, and 12.4% who were 65 years of age or older. The median age was 28 years. For every 100 females, there were 105.1 males. For every 100 females age 18 and over, there were 93.8 males.

The median income for a household in the town was $17,375, and the median income for a family was $16,250. Males had a median income of $20,938 versus $18,333 for females. The per capita income for the town was $9,115. About 39.7% of families and 39.8% of the population were below the poverty line, including 58.8% of those under the age of eighteen and 26.1% of those 65 or over.

NRHP Sites
 

The Citizens State Bank and Dwight Presbyterian Mission are located in Marble City.

Notes

References

Towns in Sequoyah County, Oklahoma
Towns in Oklahoma
Fort Smith metropolitan area
Cherokee towns in Oklahoma